Gary Brice (born 7 October 1948) is a former Australian rules footballer who played with South Melbourne in the VFL during the 1970s. 

A solidly built wingman who could play at half forward, Brice started his career at Port Melbourne in the Victorian Football Association, before being recruited by South Melbourne in 1970. After 171 games at South, he returned to Port Melbourne as captain-coach in 1980, and coached there until 1983, leading the club to three successive premierships from 1980 until 1982. He later coached ailing VFA club Camberwell in the 1990 season, in which it was winless; Brice walked out on the club less than a month before the start of the 1991 season, and the club withdrew permanently from the VFA within a week.

In August 2003 he was selected to coach Port Melbourne's official 'Team of the Century'.

References

External links

1948 births
Living people
Australian rules footballers from Victoria (Australia)
Sydney Swans players
Port Melbourne Football Club players
Port Melbourne Football Club coaches
Camberwell Football Club coaches